Forbes Ridge is a ridge about  long in the Britannia Range, Antarctica, extending north from Mount McClintock along the east side of Hinton Glacier. It was named by the Advisory Committee on Antarctic Names for Robert B. Forbes of the University of Alaska, who made geological studies in the McMurdo Sound area with U.S. Navy Operation Deep Freeze, 1955–56, and during the summer season, 1962–63.

References 

Ridges of Oates Land